Jean Pierre Marie Orchampt (9 December 1923 – 21 August 2021) was a French prelate of the Roman Catholic Church. Prior to his death, he was the oldest living bishop from France, at the age of 97.

Orchampt was born in Vesoul and was ordained a priest on 29 June 1948. Orchampt was appointed auxiliary bishop of the Archdiocese of Montpellier as well as titular bishop of Aquae in Mauretania on 14 June 1971 and consecrated on 18 September 1971. Orchampt was appointed bishop of Diocese of Angers on 5 July 1974 and remained at this post until his retirement on 20 March 2000. He died in August 2021 at the age of 97.

References

External links
 Catholic-Hierarchy
  Angers Diocese (French)
 Montpellier Archdiocese (French)

1923 births
2021 deaths
20th-century Roman Catholic bishops in France
Bishops of Angers
People from Vesoul